Carmichael is a census-designated place (CDP) in Sacramento County, California, United States. It is a suburb in the Greater Sacramento metropolitan area. The population was 79,793 at the 2020 census.

Geography and geology
Carmichael is located at  (38.639431, -121.321348).

History
Daniel W. Carmichael (born 1867) came to California in 1885.<ref>Leigh Hadley Irvine, 1905, A history of the new California: its resources and people, Volume 2, The Lewis Publishing Company</ref> In 1909, he developed Carmichael Colony No. I,  of what was once part of the Rancho San Juan Mexican land grant. He later bought another , previously part of the Rancho Del Paso Mexican land grant, that he called Carmichael Colony No. 2. It bordered the first colony to the east and Walnut Avenue to the west; the southern boundary was Arden Way with Sutter Avenue to the north.

Demographics

2010
At the 2010 census Carmichael had a population of 61,762. The racial makeup of Carmichael was 49,776 (80.6%) White, 3,972 (5.8%) African American, 546 (0.9%) Native American, 2,653 (4.3%) Asian (0.9% Filipino, 0.9% Chinese, 0.6% Korean, 0.5% Japanese, 0.5% Indian, 0.3% Vietnamese, 0.6% Other), 287 (0.5%) Pacific Islander, 2,035 (3.3%) from other races, and 3,493 (5.7%) from two or more races. There were 7.218 Hispanic or Latino people of any race (11.7%).

The census reported that 60,790 people (98.4% of the population) lived in households, 467 (0.8%) lived in non-institutionalized group quarters, and 505 (0.8%) were institutionalized.

There were 26,036 households, 7,431 (28.5%) had children under the age of 18 living in them, 11,016 (42.3%) were opposite-sex married couples living together, 3,630 (13.9%) had a female householder with no husband present, 1,417 (5.4%) had a male householder with no wife present.  There were 1,642 (6.3%) unmarried opposite-sex partnerships, and 229 (0.9%) same-sex married couples or partnerships. 8,080 households (31.0%) were one person and 3,363 (12.9%) had someone living alone who was 65 or older. The average household size was 2.33.  There were 16,063 families (61.7% of households); the average family size was 2.91.

The age distribution was 13,060 people (21.1%) under the age of 18, 5,370 people (8.7%) aged 18 to 24, 14,388 people (23.3%) aged 25 to 44, 18,054 people (29.2%) aged 45 to 64, and 10,890 people (17.6%) who were 65 or older.  The median age was 42.4 years. For every 100 females, there were 89.6 males.  For every 100 females age 18 and over, there were 86.1 males.

There were 28,165 housing units at an average density of 2,042.0 per square mile, of the occupied units 14,472 (55.6%) were owner-occupied and 11,564 (44.4%) were rented. The homeowner vacancy rate was 2.3%; the rental vacancy rate was 9.8%.  34,442 people (55.8% of the population) lived in owner-occupied housing units and 26,348 people (42.7%) lived in rental housing units.

2000
At the 2000 census there were 49,742 people, 20,631 households, and 13,224 families in the CDP. The racial makeup of the CDP was 86.61% White, 2.69% African American, 0.83% Native American, 3.58% Asian, 0.27% Pacific Islander, 2.09% from other races, and 3.92% from two or more races. Hispanic or Latino people of any race were 6.99%.

Of the 20,631 households 29.4% had children under the age of 18 living with them, 46.7% were married couples living together, 12.9% had a female householder with no husband present, and 35.9% were non-families. 29.0% of households were one person and 10.5% were one person aged 65 or older.  The average household size was 2.36 and the average family size was 2.90.

The age distribution was 23.3% under the age of 18, 8.2% from 18 to 24, 26.6% from 25 to 44, 24.8% from 45 to 64, and 17.1% 65 or older.  The median age was 40 years. For every 100 females, there were 89.9 males.  For every 100 females age 18 and over, there were 85.6 males.

The median household income was $47,041 and the median family income  was $59,002. Males had a median income of $40,435 versus $32,265 for females. The per capita income for the CDP was $26,811.  About 6.4% of families and 9.8% of the population were below the poverty line, including 12.8% of those under age 18 and 4.2% of those age 65 or over.

Government

Education

Carmichael is served by one public school district, San Juan Unified.

Elementary schools
 Albert Schweitzer Elementary
 Cameron Ranch Elementary
 Carmichael Elementary
 Charles Peck Elementary
 Coyle Avenue Elementary
 Del Dayo Elementary
 El Rancho Elementary School, K-8
 Garfield Elementary (no longer exists, became the San Juan pupil enrollment office)
 Mary A. Deterding Elementary
 Mission Avenue Elementary
 Thomas Kelly Elementary
 Sacramento Adventist Academy, K-12 
 Victory Christian School, K-12

Junior high schools
 El Rancho Elementary School, K-8
 John Barrett Middle School
 Our Lady of the Assumption Catholic School, K-8
 St. John the Evangelist Catholic School, K-8
 Starr King Middle School, K-8
 Victory Christian School, K-12
 Winston Churchill Middle School

High schools
 Del Campo High School
 Sacramento Adventist Academy 
 Victory Christian High School

La Sierra High School operated from 1957 to 1983, when it closed due to budget cuts, being selected among several schools in the district due to having the lowest attendance. The site was adapted as La Sierra Community Center in 1985.

Local high school students also attend other nearby schools in the San Juan Unified School District, such as:
 Bella Vista High School in Fair Oaks
 Casa Roble High School in Orangevale
 El Camino Fundamental High School in Arden-Arcade
 Encina High School in Arden-Arcade
 Jesuit High School in Arden-Arcade
 Mesa Verde High School in Citrus Heights
 Mira Loma High School in Arden-Arcade
 San Juan High School in Citrus Heights
 Rio Americano High School in Arden-Arcade

Points of interest

Carmichael Park
Carmichael Park is a major  park in the town. The park includes five ballfields, six tennis courts, and a nine-hole disc golf course. The Community Clubhouse, Veterans' Memorial Building, the Daniel Bishop Memorial Pavilion for the Performing Arts, and the Great Wall of Carmichael are all within the park. A year-round farmers market is held at the park every Sunday from 9 a.m. to 2 p.m., hosted by the nonprofit BeMoneySmartUSA.BeMoneySmartUSA

Jensen Botanical Gardens
The Jensen Botanical Gardens are at 8520 Fair Oaks Boulevard. They exhibit a variety of flora including camellias, dogwoods, azaleas, and rhododendrons.

Chautauqua Playhouse
The Chautauqua Playhouse has been in the La Sierra Community Center since 1985. The 95-seat theater shows comedies, dramas, and musicals. It has a children's theater with performances held on Saturdays. Chautauqua Playhouse is at 5325 Engle Road (between Walnut Avenue and Fair Oaks Boulevard).

Ancil Hoffman Park
Ancil Hoffman Park is a major park within the American River Parkway in Carmichael. It is a  park. It features the Effie Yeaw Nature Center. The oak-canopied park is bordered on two sides by the American River. Reconstructed Maidu Indian homes are at the entrance to the nature center. The Ancil Hoffman Golf Course is also part of the park. Many species of animals can be seen, including wild turkey, deer, coyotes and hawks. One can access the park via the Watt Avenue exit off Highway 50.

American River Parkway
The American River Parkway is a  parkway that runs along the American River throughout Sacramento County. The parkway connects many smaller parks and numerous boat launching points. It can be accessed by various exits off Highway 50 in Sacramento County.

American River Bike Trail
A portion of the American River Bike Trail crosses Carmichael near the southern community boundary. The bike trail is used by bicycle commuters and for recreational walking, biking, and running.

Notable people
 Dusty Baker, manager of the Houston Astros (graduated from Del Campo High School)
 Matt Barnes, former NBA small forward (graduated from Del Campo High School)
 Chris Bosio, MLB player for the Milwaukee Brewers and Seattle Mariners, coach for the Chicago Cubs
 Jane Brucker, actress 
 Jessica Chastain, actress and film producer
 Wesley Chesbro, California State Assemblyman and former state senator from Arcata
 John Daly, golfer, winner of 1991 PGA Championship and 1995 Open Championship (born in Carmichael)
 Milt Gantenbein, three-time NFL champion for the Green Bay Packers, born in New Albin, Iowa
 Andrew Gray, actor and model; plays role of Red Ranger in Power Rangers Megaforce Ian Hecox, member of the Internet comedy duo Smosh
 Laura Ling, journalist, political prisoner
 Lisa Ling, television personality and host of National Geographic Channel's Explorer Debbie Meyer, Olympic swimming gold medalist (graduated from Rio Americano High School)
 Scott Miller (1960–2013), guitarist and leader of bands Game Theory and The Loud Family
 Anthony Padilla, former member of the Internet comedy duo Smosh
 Leonard Peltier, murderer of two Federal Bureau of Investigation agents
 Manny Parra, Milwaukee Brewers pitcher
 Cynthia Robinson, trumpeter and vocalist, Sly & The Family Stone
 Alek Skarlatos, Oregon Army National Guardsman, recipient of the Knights of the Legion of Honour
 Brenda Song, actress, TV series The Suite Life of Zack & Cody and animated TV series Amphibia''
 Marshall Sperbeck, head football coach, Sacramento State University (2007–2014)
 Peja Stojaković, NBA player for the Sacramento Kings.
 Spencer Stone, United States Air Force staff sergeant, recipient of the Knights of the Legion of Honour

Adjacent areas

See also
 Mercy San Juan Medical Center

References

External links
 Carmichael Community Project
 Carmichael Times
 Chautauqua Playhouse
 iCarmichael

 
Census-designated places in Sacramento County, California
Populated places established in 1909
1909 establishments in California
Census-designated places in California